Malevolent Rapture is a 2006 album by thrash metal/death metal band Legion of the Damned. It was their first album since the demise their preceding band Occult with the loss of previous lead singer Rachel Heyzer. In common with later albums the lyrics heavily reference the dark side of the occult and apocalyptic themes. The album was created in Stage One Studio and produced by Andy Classen.

Track listing 
"Legion of the Damned" - 3:12
"Death's Head March" - 3:47
"Werewolf Corpse" - 3:57
"Into the Eye of the Storm" - 4:31
"Malevolent Rapture" - 4:06
"Demonfist" - 4:29
"Taste of the Whip" - 3:39
"Bleed for Me" - 3:58
"Scourging the Crowned King" - 3:40
"Killing for Recreation" - 3:51

Personnel
Maurice Swinkels – vocals
Richard Ebisch – guitar
Twan Fleuren – bass
Erik Fleuren – drums

References

External links
Official website
Legion of the Damned at Massacre Records

2006 debut albums
Legion of the Damned (band) albums
Massacre Records albums
Albums produced by Andy Classen